XOXO is an annual festival and conference held in Portland, Oregon, that describes itself as "an experimental festival for independent artists who live and work online". XOXO was founded in 2012 by Andy Baio and Andy McMillan with funding from prepaid tickets and other contributions via Kickstarter. In 2016, technology website The Verge called it "the internet's best festival".

XOXO was held every year from 2012 to 2019 except for 2017; it has not been held since 2019, as a result of the COVID-19 pandemic.

History

2012 

The inaugural event was held in Portland's Yale Union Laundry Building in September 2012 with approximately 400 participants. 

Associated events included live music, film screenings, an arcade of independently produced videogames, a market, and food trucks. News media and bloggers noted an "impressive list of speakers" and an "intimate tone" missing from other technology-focused conferences. Ruth Brown wrote "the audience was overwhelmingly white, male, middle class and educated."

2013 
The festival returned to the Yale Union Laundry Building with speakers, workshops, films, music shows, game events, and a market. Baio described it as being "about artists and hackers and makers that are using the internet to make a living doing what they love independently without sacrificing creative or financial control". Portland Monthly compared the event to the larger South by Southwest festival, quoting Matthew Haughey saying SXSW speakers are "in the business of selling technologies" and XOXO speakers are "creating things". To handle increased interest while remaining small (500 conference tickets and 200 "fringe event" tickets), it had an application process with questions intended to filter out people who wanted to market to attendees.

2014 

XOXO 2014 was held at The Redd, a former metal stamping facility in an industrial area of SE Portland. Conference speakers included Anita Sarkeesian. Sarkeesian's appearance was met with controversy from Gamergate supporters, with one protester trespassing the festival grounds and Portland Police Bureau being called to the festival.

2015 

XOXO 2015 was held at the Revolution Hall in Portland, Oregon 

Engadget wrote many talks were "emotionally driven... centered around the difficult issues of being independent." The Guardian attributed the festival's popularity to "its gentleness, its emotive undertone and thoughtful curation, but also its commitment to supporting individual artists over businesses and corporates."

2016 

XOXO 2016 was also held at the Revolution Hall and was attended by over 1,200 attendees. The Verge called it "the internet's best festival," and highlighted its attention to detail, focus on diversity, and curation. A follow-up article featured highlights and discoveries from the festival lineup.

2018 

After a one-year hiatus in 2017, the sixth XOXO was held on September 6–9, 2018 at a new venue, Veterans Memorial Coliseum. Nearly twice the size of past years, over 2,300 attendees attended XOXO 2018.

The festival opened with a keynote from comedian Cameron Esposito about the production of her "Rape Jokes" standup special. 

The festival closed with an unannounced concert by Lizzo on the festival's main stage, who surprised attendees after the show by performing karaoke in the Blue Ox Bar, a dedicated pop-up dive bar created for the event. Other on-site installations included a secret speakeasy, accessible only by solving a series of puzzles accessible via telephone booths around the venue, and Dear Future Me, an interactive installation by illustrator Alice Lee inviting attendees to mail a postcard to their future selves.

2019 

After experimenting with a larger event, XOXO returned to its previous size and venue for its seventh year, with 1,200 attendees at Revolution Hall. Organizers cited the desire to return to a more comfortable, accessible, and intimate size.

2020–2022 

The 2020 XOXO festival was canceled due to the COVID-19 pandemic. In an interview with Willamette Week, festival co-founder Andy Baio said that, due to uncertainty about the duration of the pandemic, "The last XOXO may have been the last one."

There was again no festival in either 2021 or 2022, due to the pandemic.

Outpost 

In June 2015, the organizers of XOXO announced they were opening a shared workspace to "bring some of our favorite people and projects in indie art and tech under one roof" in a 13,000 square foot building in Portland's Central Eastside Industrial District. The Outpost was open from February 2016 until December 2016.

References

External links 
 

Festivals in Portland, Oregon
Arts festivals in the United States
New media art festivals
Kickstarter projects
Festivals established in 2012
2012 establishments in Oregon